Thou is an archaic second person singular pronoun in English.

Thou may also refer to:
 Thousandth(s) of an inch, a derived unit of length used in engineering and manufacturing
 Thousand
 Thou., a reference to French botanist Louis-Marie Aubert du Petit-Thouars

Geography
 Le Thou, a commune of Charente-Maritime, France
 Thou, Cher, a commune of Cher, France
 Thou, Loiret, a commune of Loiret, France

Music
 Thou (Belgian band), a Belgian rock band
 Thou (American band), an American sludge metal band

People with the family name de Thou 
 Jacques Auguste de Thou, French historian
 Christophe de Thou, French advocate
 Nicolas de Thou, French cleric, Bishop of Chartres

See also

Thon (disambiguation)